The Sts. Peter and Paul's Cathedral Basilica , also called Pécs Cathedral, is a religious building of the Catholic church that serves as the cathedral of the Diocese of Pécs, and is located in the city of Pécs, Hungary.

The foundations of the cathedral of Pécs are from the Roman period, around the fourth century. It is believed that at the site of the cathedral today an early Christian basilica, which spread westwards between the eighth and ninth centuries. Under the reign of Stephen I, the decision to modify the construction and, presumably, the two western towers date from this period was taken. After a great fire of 1064 was carried out construction of the Romanesque basilica, with the participation of Italian architects. In the Middle Ages, the church was enlarged with two lateral towers and Gothic chapels. After the damage and degradation caused by the Turkish occupation (1543-1686) there were attempts to restore the building. The neo-Romanesque appearance today is the result of the reconstruction carried out between 1882 and 1891, faithfully fulfilled the original plans of the cathedral architect Friedrich von Schmidt Viennese. The length of the church is 70 meters, with a width of 22 meters and height in the towers of up to 60 meters.

See also
Roman Catholicism in Hungary
List of cathedrals in Hungary
Sts. Peter and Paul Cathedral

References

Roman Catholic cathedrals in Hungary
Buildings and structures in Pécs
Roman Catholic churches completed in 1891
19th-century Roman Catholic church buildings in Hungary